When Night Falls (Alternative title: Into the Night), is a 1985 Israeli drama film written and directed by Eitan Green. The film was selected as the Israeli entry for the Best Foreign Language Film at the 58th Academy Awards, but was not accepted as a nominee.

Plot

Giora (Assi Dayan) runs a bar and dreams of opening a restaurant. He has made a mess of his life — his marriage is in trouble, since he is pathologically cheating on his wife; his parents (Yosef Millo and Orna Porat) have separated; and his father arrives for an extended visit from Nahariya. Giora spends time with his army buddies, recalling their experiences during the War in Lebanon. His father is undergoing a major life crisis and finds both the loneliness of the city and his son's lifestyle unappealing. As a non-Jew in a Jewish society, he feels estranged, an outsider who has never been able to adapt, and contemplates suicide. Eventually, Giora's parents decide to attempt a reconciliation, until tragedy strikes.

Cast
 Assi Dayan as Giora
 Yosef Millo as Bernard
 Orna Porat as Ruth
 Dani Roth as Dudi
 Haya Pik-Pardo as Sheri
 Lasha Rosenberg as Karen

See also
 List of submissions to the 58th Academy Awards for Best Foreign Language Film
 List of Israeli submissions for the Academy Award for Best Foreign Language Film

References

External links
 

1985 films
1985 drama films
Israeli drama films
1980s Hebrew-language films